Sir Joseph Sebag-Montefiore (born 29 August 1822 in London, died 19 January 1903 in London) was a British banker, stockbroker and politician.

He was the son of Solomon Sebag and his wife Sarah Montefiore. He married Adelaide Cohen, daughter of Louis Cohen and Rebecca Floretta Keyser, in June 1851.

On 29 August 1885 his surname was supplemented with royal permission with that of his mother's family as Sebag-Montefiore.

He was the nephew and heir of Moses Montefiore.

Career
He was a prominent figure in the City of London and founded the stockbroking firm of Joseph Sebag & Company.

He held a number of public offices, including Justice of the Peace (J.P.) for Kent and the Cinque Ports, Lieutenant of the City of London, High Sheriff of Kent. For a long time he was the officially recognized representative of the English Jewish community. Amongst other positions he held, he was, from 1894 to 1902, the President of the Municipal Council of Spanish-Portuguese Jews in London. In 1896 he was knighted.

References

Further reading
Salomon Wininger, Große Jüdische National-Biographie. Band IV, page 416.

Politicians from London
British stockbrokers
British Jews
1822 births
1903 deaths
British bankers
Jewish bankers
19th-century British businesspeople